Tourism in Azerbaijan has been an important sector of the Azerbaijani economy since the 1990s. According to Azerbaijan's Center for Economic and Social Development, the country is in 39th place among 148 countries in tourism competitiveness indicators. The World Travel and Tourism Council reported that Azerbaijan is among the top ten countries with the greatest increase in visitor exports from 2010 to 2016. The country had the world's fastest-developing travel and tourism economy (a 46.1% increase) in 2017. To promote tourism, Azerbaijan sponsored Atlético Madrid jerseys reading "Azerbaijan – Land of Fire". In 2018, a new tourism brand and a slogan "take another look" were introduced.

Visas

Tourist visas can be obtained from an Azerbaijani embassy or electronically online without an embassy visit. In 2016, a tax-free shopping system was introduced to attract foreign shoppers. Purchases must be made up to 90 days before export to be eligible for the tax refund.

In January 2017, Azerbaijan introduced its electronic visa for a single-entry visit of up to 30 days. The e-visa is available to tourists from 93 countries, who can apply on the e-visa website. A visa is not required for citizens of the Commonwealth of Independent States (except Turkmenistan and Armenia) who intend to visit Azerbaijan within 90 days.

Due to a state of war with Armenia, the government of Azerbaijan has banned the entry of citizens from Armenia, as well as citizens of any other country who are of Armenian descent (including Armenian Russians, Turkish Armenians, etc.), to the Republic of Azerbaijan.

Statistics

Over 1.4 million tourists visited Azerbaijan in 2008. In 2017, a record-high number of 2,691,998 foreign citizens visited Azerbaijan. Visitors to the country in 2017 came from the following countries:

Most of the visitors were from Europe, Asia, and North America. There were 1,818,258 foreigners in Azerbaijan in 2017. The overwhelming majority were citizens of the Russian Federation, Georgia, Iran, Turkey and UAE. “Azerbaijan expects a massive flow of tourists from the Arab countries, Iran, Russia, Kazakhstan, much less will come from Ukraine and Belarus, and only a small flow from European states.

Azerbaijan had 320 hotels in 2007, 370 in 2008, 452 in 2009, 499 in 2010, 508 in 2011 and 514 in 2012. The country has 230 tourist agencies and 560 hotels and hostels.

State support
Azerbaijan began tourism-development planning for 2002–2005 and 2010–2014. The programs compiled tourism statistics, particularly its effect on the GNP. The Ministry of Tourism made a development study from 2008 to 2016 to increase accommodations and attract foreigners.

In March 2018, Ministry of Culture tourism head Aydin Ismiyev expressed a desire to develop Halal tourism. The following month, the 17th international tourism and travel exhibition (AITF 2018) opened. Azerbaijan also provides culinary tourism.

Resort areas
In addition to the capital, Baku, Azerbaijan has a number of resort areas with varied climates and a variety of flora and fauna. Notable areas are the cities as Ganja, Nakhchivan, Gabala and Shaki Shaki is noted for its architectural heritage: the 1763 Palace of Shaki Khans, mausoleums and fortresses. Nakhchivan was a centre of traditional medicine and has salt mines and mausoleums. Lankaran, near the Caspian Sea, has a history dating back to the 10th century BC.

Historic monuments

Baku's Old City

Baku has a number of historic and architectural monuments. The Old City is its ancient core. In December 2000, the Old City (including the Palace of the Shirvanshahs and the Maiden Tower) was named Azerbaijan's first UNESCO World Heritage Site.

The Walled City of Baku (Icheri Sheher) hosts over 50 historic and architectural monuments, including Synyg Gala (the Broken Tower). The Palace of the Shirvanshahs, built at the beginning of the 15th century, is a hallmark of Azerbaijani architecture. The complex contains the palace, the Shirvanshah's residence, a mosque with minarets, a bathhouse, and the residence of Seyid Yahya Bakuvi. Construction began in 1441 and was completed in 1558.

The Maiden Tower, in the south-western part of the walled city, was built in two stages. The tower has of eight tiers and a  well. It was built by 12th-century architect Masud ibn Davud, who was probably the father of the architect of the Mardakan Round Tower. Its foundation is believed to be a Sasanid-era Zoroastrian site.

Ateshgah of Baku

The Ateshgah of Baku is a temple in the south-western Suraxanı raion on the Absheron Peninsula,  from Baku. West of the Caspian Sea, it was built by Hindu, Sikh and Parsi traders from the Indian subcontinent during the 17th and 18th centuries. Ateshgah is a fire temple, with its central stone shrine on a pocket of natural gas. The present structure was built around 1713, and the central shrine was funded by the merchant Kanchanagaran in 1810.

The Absheron Peninsula is noted for its shallow oil deposits, which trigger natural oil fires. Zoroastrianism has a long history in Azerbaijan, and the region was considered sacred by Zoroastrians due to these natural fires. Scholars have speculated that the temple may have been an ancient Zoroastrian shrine which was destroyed by invading Islamic armies during the Muslim conquest of Persia and its neighbouring regions.

The complex was converted into a museum in 1975 and receives about 15,000 visitors a year. It was nominated as a World Heritage site in 1998 and was declared a state historical-architectural reserve.

Gobustan National Park

Gobustan National Park, southwest of Baku, is noted for its rock carvings. The park was founded in 1966 when the region was declared a national historical landmark to preserve its ancient carvings and mud volcanoes.

Gobustan Rock Art Cultural Landscape, in the park, has more than 6,000 rock engravings dating back from 5,000 to 40,000 years. The site also features the remains of inhabited caves, settlements and burials, reflecting intensive use by the area's inhabitants from the Upper Paleolithic to the Middle Ages.

The rock engravings depict primitive men, animals, weapons, ritual dances, bullfights, boats with armed oarsmen, warriors with lances, camel caravans, and the sun and stars. In 2007, Gobustan was declared a UNESCO World Heritage site of universal value.

Mardakan castles
Mardakan, a settlement in Baku, has two ancient towers. The quadrangular tower was built in the 12th century by Akhsitan, the son of Shirvanshah Mechehrin, to commemorate a military victory. The inside of the tower is divided into five tiers. Its inner part consists of three circles. The inscription on the tower wall reads that it was built by the architect Abdulmejid Masud in 1232.

Palace of Shaki Khans

The Palace of Shaki Khans in Shaki,  from Baku, was a summer residence of the Shaki Khanate which was built in the early 18th century. It features decorative tiles, fountains, and several stained-glass windows. The exterior is decorated with dark blue, turquoise and ochre tiles in geometric patterns; the murals, coloured with tempera, are inspired by the poetry of Nizami Ganjavi.
Apart from being uniquely beautiful one of the outstanding features is that no nails or glue was used in the construction of the building.

Modern architecture
The white Heydar Aliyev Center, designed by Pritzker Architecture Prize winner Zaha Hadid, is a symbol of modern Baku. It contains two ornamental pools and an artificial lake.

The  Flame Towers, Baku's tallest building complex, has flame-shaped towers. Skyscrapercity.com awarded the complex first place for its lighting.

Mountain tourism
Mountain tourism is popular in Azerbaijan, and two large resorts (Tufandag and Shahdag) have been built in the Gusar and Gabala regions.

Mountain tourism is encouraged by the Mountain Sports Club (MSC), which was founded in 1999. Club members have climbed Mount Shahdagh.

Khinalig, in the Quba region on the southeastern ridge of the Caucasus Mountains, is Azerbaijan's highest mountain village. There are a number of caves around the village, which has a small museum with local artifacts such as tools, toys, clothes and manuscripts.

Lahij is known for its forests, mountains, waterfalls, historic monuments and ancient artifacts. Laza is a village at the foot of  Mount Shahdagh.

It has private homes, hotels, cottages, villages and tent camping in summer. Winter activities include snowmobiling, horseback riding, sledding and tubing, and the resort has a snow park for children.

National parks

Azerbaijan has eight other national parks. Zangezur National Park (formerly Ordubad National Park) was renamed and expanded in 2009. The park has 58 species of animals (35 vertebrates and 23 insects) and 39 endangered plant species. It is home to the Anatolian leopard, mountain sheep, bezoar goat, white-tail sea eagle, golden eagle, and little bustard.

It is home to many bird species (including turaj, little bustard, bustard, swans and flamingoes), which winter and nest in the marshy areas. Djeyran gazelles are the most populous mammals in the region.

Ag-Gel National Park, also semi-arid, is on the Mil plain of the Kur-Araz Lowland. Over 140 species of birds are found, including 89 species of nesting birds such as partridge, spoonbill, swan, teal and bustard. The park is on the Ramsar Convention list of internationally important wetlands.

Hirkan National Park, on the Lankaran Lowland and in the Talysh Mountains, is 99% forested and strictly protected. The park preserves relictual and endemic plant species from the Tertiary, and contains 150 types of trees and bushes such as the Hirkan box tree, iron tree, chestnut leave oak, fig tree, Hirkan pear tree, silk acacia, Caucasus palm tree, Caspian Gleditsia, butcher's broom and alders. Fauna includes the Persian leopard, Talysh pheasant and golden eagle.

Altyaghach National Park is 90.5% covered by temperate deciduous broadleaf forest, and major tree species include iron trees, Caucasus hornbeam, Oriental beech, cud and birches. The park is home to the rare East Caucasian tur (Capra cylindricornis), a mountain-dwelling caprine found only in the eastern half of the Caucasus Mountains. Other species include roe deer, bear, wild boar, lynx, fox, rabbit, squirrel, and wolf.

The Soviet-era predecessor of Absheron National Park was the Absheron State Nature Preserve which was created in July 1969 to protect gazelle, Caspian seal, and water birds. The area's climate is also semi-arid (Köppen classification BSk). Vegetation is sparse due to soil dryness and salinity. Seacoast sand plants make up 42.6% of vegetation, meadow grasses 13.2% and annual salt grasses 5.2%. Ephemeral plants develop in early spring. Fauna is similar to that in Shirvan National Park: gazelle, jackal, fox, rabbit, badger, in Caspian waters seal and various fishes, birds such as silver gull, wheezing swan, grey and red-headed black- and white-eyed black ducks, white bittern, sandpiper, marsh belibagli, sea bozcha, and other migrant birds.

Shahdag National Park, in northern Azerbaijan on the border with Russia and Georgia, was created in 2006. The World Bank allocated a $17 million loan and $8 million grant in 2007, and the government of Japan provided an $8 million grant for the southern Caucasus' largest national park.

Göygöl National Park, created in 2008, is Azerbaijan's newest national park. Its Soviet-era predecessor was the Goy Gol State Reserve, established in 1925. The park, in the east on the northern slopes of the Lesser Caucasus, includes Lake Göygöl. It contains over 420 plant species (including 20 which are endemic to the area) and is home to brown bears, Caucasian red deer, roe deer, and lynx. Bird species include the lammergeyer, raven, and mountain partridge.

Museums
Most museums are located in major cities, such as Baku (including the Baku Museum of Miniature Books), Ganja, Nakhchivan, Sumgait, Lankaran, Mingachevir and Shaki.

Hunting
Azerbaijan permits the hunting of Dagestan goat, wild boar, rabbit, forest dove, quail, partridge, water birds (goose, duck, coot), woodcock and chamois. Hunting is prohibited in the Aghdam, Khanlar, Goranboy, Dashkasan, Gadabay and Ter Ter regions, the Caspian Sea islands, green zones, protected areas and near cities and resort areas.

See also
 Culture of Azerbaijan
 Tourism in Baku
 Ministry of Culture (Azerbaijan)
 State Tourism Agency of the Republic of Azerbaijan

References

External links

 Official Azerbaijan tourism site
 https://www.azernews.az/nation/82961.html
 https://www.bestbakutours.com
 Travel information from Visions of Azerbaijan Journal

 
Azerbaijan
Azerbaijan